Krishna Kumar is an Indian intellectual and academician, noted for his writings in the sociology and history of education. His academic oeuvre has drawn on multiple sources, including the school curriculum as a means of social inquiry. His work is also notable for its critical engagement with modernity in a colonized society. His writings explore the patterns of conflict and interaction between forces of the vernacular and the state. As a teacher and bilingual writer, he has developed an aesthetic of pedagogy and knowledge that aspires to mitigate aggression and violence. In addition to his academic work, he writes essays and short stories in Hindi, and has also written for children. He has taught at the Central Institute of Education, University of Delhi, from 1981 to 2016. He was also the Dean and Head of the institution. From 2004 to 2010, he was Director of the National Council of Educational Research and Training (NCERT), an apex organization for curricular reforms in India. He was awarded the Padma Shri by the President of India in 2011.

Early life
Born in Allahabad, Uttar Pradesh, in 1951, Krishna Kumar grew up in Tikamgarh, a district town in Madhya Pradesh (MP) where he went to school and college. His father was a lawyer and writer of books on law, and his mother was one of the pioneers of girls’ education in MP. He completed his higher education at the University of Sagar, Madhya Pradesh and the University of Toronto where he attained Ph.D. in educational theory.

Career
Krishna Kumar started his teaching career at Kirori Mal College of Delhi University in 1971. Krishna Kumar joined the Central Institute of Education, Delhi University, in 1981. He served Delhi University till 2016 as Professor. He is currently Honorary Professor, Panjab University. Around the same time, he also started writing about children’s education in Dinaman and came under the influence of its editor, Raghuvir Sahay, a major poet and writer of modern Hindi. Kumar’s first book, Raj, Samaj aur Shiksha, presents a revised version of some of the essays first published in Dinaman.  He has been a National Lecturer of the University Grants Commission, a Fellow of the Nehru Memorial Museum and Library, a visiting fellow at the Centre for Modern Oriental Studies, Berlin, the Centre for the Advanced Study of India, University of Pennsylvania, and an Erasmus Mundus Fellow at the Institute of Education, University of London. He has delivered several memorial lectures, including the Gladwyn lecture in the House of Lords. He was awarded the Jawaharlal Nehru Fellowship to examine the history textbooks of India and Pakistan. He was awarded the Padma Shri by the President of India in 2011. The same year, the Institute of Education, University of London, awarded him an Honorary D.Litt. in Education.

From 2004 to 2010, Prof Kumar served as the Director of National Council for Educational Research and Training (NCERT), Delhi. National Curricular Framework (2005), one of the significant documents pertaining of elementary education in the past decade, was prepared under his leadership along with position papers on key issues on Education. This was followed by revision of NCERT textbooks from grade I to XII which created through unprecedented collaboration between large number of academicians, practitioners, teachers, teacher educators. He was also instrumental in setting up Reading Cell, to focus on issues of early literacy in Indian classrooms.

Publications
Books in English:
 Social Character of Learning (Sage, 1989).
 Political Agenda of Education (Sage, 1991). Retitled Politics of Education in Colonial India (Routledge, 2014).
 What is Worth Teaching (Orient Longman, 1992; revised, 1997; 3rd ed. 2004)..
 Learning from Conflict (Orient Longman, 1996).
 The Child’s Language and the Teacher (National Book Trust, 2000). Translated into Hindi, Maithili, Marathi, Tamil, Telugu, Tibetan and Kannada).
 Prejudice and Pride (Viking/Penguin, 2001). Translated into Hindi and published by Rajkamal.
 Education, Conflict and Peace (Orient Blackswan, 2016). 
 Battle for Peace (Penguin, 2007). Translated into Hindi and published by Rajkamal.
 A Pedagogue’s Romance: Reflections on Schooling (Oxford University Press, 2008).

Edited volumes:
 Sociological  Perspective on Education (co-editor S. Shukla; Chankya, 1984).
 Democracy and Education in India  (Radiant and Nehru Memorial Museum and Library, 1990).
 Social Change and Education in South Asia  (co-editor,  Joachim Oesterheld; Orient Longman, 2007).
 Constructing Modern Asian Citizenship  (co-editor,  Edward Vickers; Routledge, 2015).
 Routledge Handbook of Education in India  (2017).
 Rethinking Schooling (Report on curriculum policies in 21 Asian countries, drafted by a committee chaired by Krishna Kumar), MGIEP Unesco, New Delhi, 2017.

Books in Hindi:
 Neelee Ankhon Wale Bagule  (short story collection; Shabdakar, 1976). 
 Raj, Samaj aur Shiksha (Rajkamal: 1991). 
 Abdul Majeed ka chhura  (travel essays; Kitabghar, 1995).
 Vichar ka Dar  (Essays; Rajkamal, 1996).
 School ki Hindi  (‘School’s Hindi’; Rajkamal, 1998).
 Shiksha aur Gyan (‘Education and Knowledge; Granthshilpi, 1999)
 Raghuvir Sahay Reader (Edited; Rajkamal and Mahatma Gandhi International Hindi University, 2000).
 Deevar ka Istemal  (Eklavya, 2008).
 Sapnon ka Perh  (Rajkamal, 2008).
 Choori Bazaar Mein Ladki  (Rajkamal, 2013).
 Kaathgodaam  (Rajkamal, 2018).
 Parhna Zara Sochna  (Ektara, 2019).

Books for children:
 Princess Pramila (Orient Longman)
 Aaj Nahi Padhunga (Rajkamal)
 Pooriyon ki Gathari (NBT, 2016)

Professor Kumar has also published a number of research papers and articles in journals. He contributes frequently to Economic and Political Weekly, and The Hindu.

References

External links
 Profile of Krishna Kumar

Living people
20th-century Indian educational theorists
1951 births
Recipients of the Padma Shri in literature & education
Jawaharlal Nehru Fellows